Lehigh Career and Technical Institute (LCTI) is a career and technical institute located in Schnecksville, Pennsylvania in the Lehigh Valley region of eastern Pennsylvania. It is one of the largest career and technical institutes in the United States. 

LCTI has a variety of programs offered to all of its students, and also offers an academic option.

History 
Lehigh Career and Technical Institute (LCTI) (formerly Lehigh County Vocational-Technical School, Lehigh County Community College when founded in 1971), is located in Schnecksville, Pennsylvania.

Located 10 miles north of Allentown, the school serves students in grades 9-12 from the nine Lehigh County school districts:

Allentown School District
Catasauqua Area School District
East Penn School District
Northern Lehigh School District
Northwestern Lehigh School District
Parkland School District
Salisbury Township School District
Southern Lehigh School District
Whitehall-Coplay School District

This region includes: Allen High School, Dieruff High School, Catasauqua High School, Emmaus High School, Northern Lehigh High School, Northwestern Lehigh High School, Parkland High School, Salisbury High School, Southern Lehigh High School, and Whitehall High School.

LCTI offers more than 50 programs in a hands-on format, with a focus on national skill standards and rigorous academics. LCTI recently completed a modernization project that has increased lab sizes, updated equipment, and added an Academic Center.

Student options 
Typically, students report to their sending school, for homeroom and daily announcements. before being transported by bus to LCTI. Once there, students will either be in a lab, which is their chosen career specialty, or the academic center, an all-day option for students, which provides them with the typical state required education, and their specialty segment. Students have the option of attending in either the AM or PM session.

LCTI offers Labs based on Careers within the Lehigh Valley. Career programs offered to students include: 

 Administrative Office Technology / Accounting 
 Advertising Design / Commercial Art
 Auto Body / Collision Repair
 Auto Technology
 Carpentry
 Cabinetmaking and Millwork
 Commercial Baking
 Graphic Imaging
 Computer Maintenance Technology
 Culinary Arts
 Dental Technology
 Diesel/Medium and Heavy Truck Technology
 Computer Aided Design (CAD)
 Early Care & Education of Young Children
 Electrical Technology
 Electro-mechanical /Mechatronics technology
 Electronics Technology / Nanofabrication
 Emerging Health Professionals
 Floral Design/Greenhouse Management
 Health Occupations/Health Related Technology
 Heating, Air Conditioning, and Refrigeration (HVAC)
 Heavy Equipment Operations / Preventive Maintenance
 Landscape Construction/Environmental Design
 Marketing and Business Education
 Masonry
 Material Handling / Logistics Technology
 Painting and Decorating
 Plumbing and Heating
 Precision Machine Tool Technology
 Pre-engineering and Engineering Technology
 Print Technology / Graphic Imaging
 Small Engines/Recreational Vehicle Repair
 Web Design / Programming
 Welding Technology

Career opportunities 
Students enrolled at LCTI have a variety of options. One of the major components is SkillsUSA, and other national leadership competitions. There is also the National FFA Organization for the students of Landscape Construction/Environmental Design and Floral Design/Greenhouse Management.

References

External links
Official website
Lehigh Career and Technical Institute on Facebook
Lehigh Career and Technical Institute on Twitter

1971 establishments in Pennsylvania
Educational institutions established in 1971
Public high schools in Pennsylvania
Schools in Lehigh County, Pennsylvania